Robertlandy Simón Aties (born 11 June 1987) is a Cuban volleyball player, a  member of Cuba men's national volleyball team from  2005–2010 and from 2019 to present day and also Italian club Cucine Lube Civitanova, 2009 NORCECA Champion, silver medalist of the 2010 World Championship, double South Korean Champion (2015, 2016).

Career
Simón debuted in the national team at age of 17. He was Cuban national team captain for 5 years.
In 2009 he achieved individual awards at 2009 World Grand Champions Cup. In 2010 Cuba, including Simon, went to the finale of 2010 World Championship with Brazil. On October 10, 2010 he achieved silver medal. He was Best Blocker of the tournament.
Simon was champion of the Italian Cup 2013/14 and of the Challenge Cup 2012/13 with Piacenza.
He used to be the world’s Best Middle Blocker before he left Cuba in 2010 right after the 2010 World Championship to pursue his dreams and to make a decent living overseas. Simon helped Al Rayyan to win the 2014 Club World Championship. He was the most expensive player in South Korea League from 2014 to 2016. Simon joined Brazilian club Sada Cruzeiro in 2016.

Style of play
Simon touched 384 cm and, according to his coach, has reached a record of 389 cm.
This happened during the athletic test for the Piacenza team at Serie A1.

Sporting achievements

Clubs

CEV Champions League
  2018/2019 – with Cucine Lube Civitanova

CEV Challenge Cup
  2012/2013 – with Copra Elior Piacenza

FIVB Club World Championship
  Belo Horizonte 2014 – with Al Rayyan
  Betim 2016 – with Sada Cruzeiro
  Poland 2017 – with Sada Cruzeiro
  Poland 2018 – with Cucine Lube Civitanova
  Betim 2019 – with Cucine Lube Civitanova
  Betim 2021 – with Cucine Lube Civitanova

South American Club Championship
  Montes Claros 2017 – with Sada Cruzeiro
  Montes Claros 2018 – with Sada Cruzeiro

National championships
 2005/2006  Cuban Championship
 2008/2009  Cuban Championship
 2009/2010  Cuban Championship
 2013/2014  Italian Cup, with Copra Elior Piacenza
 2014/2015  South Korean Championship, with Ansan OK Savings Bank
 2015/2016  South Korean Championship, with Ansan OK Savings Bank
 2016/2017  Brazilian Superliga, with Sada Cruzeiro
 2017/2018  Brazilian Superliga, with Sada Cruzeiro
 2018/2019  Italian Championship, with Cucine Lube Civitanova
 2019/2020  Italian Cup, with Cucine Lube Civitanova
 2020/2021  Italian Cup, with Cucine Lube Civitanova
 2022/2023  Italian Cup, with Gas Sales Bluenergy Piacenza

National team
 2005  U21 World Championship
 2005  FIVB World League
 2005  America's Cup
 2006  Central American and Caribbean Games
 2007  NORCECA Championship
 2007  Pan American Games
 2007  America's Cup
 2008  America's Cup
 2009  NORCECA Championship
 2009  FIVB World Grand Champions Cup
 2010  FIVB World Championship
 2019  NORCECA Champions Cup
 2019  NORCECA Championship

Individually
 2007 Pan American Games – Best Blocker
 2007 America's Cup – Best Spiker
 2007 America's Cup – Best Blocker
 2008 America's Cup – Best Spiker
 2008 America's Cup – Best Scorer
 2009 FIVB World League – Best Spiker
 2009 FIVB World League – Best Blocker
 2009 NORCECA Championship – Best Blocker
 2009 FIVB World Grand Champions Cup – Best Blocker
 2009 FIVB World Grand Champions Cup – Best Server
 2009 FIVB World Grand Champions Cup – Most Valuable Player
 2010 FIVB World Championship – Best Blocker
 2014 FIVB Club World Championship – Best Middle Blocker
 2015 South Korean Championship – Best 7
 2015 Korea-Japan Top Match – Most Valuable Player
 2016 South Korean Championship – Finals Most Valuable Player
 2017 FIVB Club World Championship – Best Middle Blocker
 2018 FIVB Club World Championship – Best Middle Blocker
 2019 NORCECA Champions Cup – Best Middle Blocker
 2019 NORCECA Champions Cup – Most Valuable Player
 2019 FIVB Club World Championship – Best Middle Blocker
 2021 Italian Volleyball Cup – Most Valuable Player

References

External links
 FIVB profile

1987 births
Living people
Cuban men's volleyball players
Volleyball players at the 2007 Pan American Games
Expatriate volleyball players in South Korea
Pan American Games medalists in volleyball
Pan American Games bronze medalists for Cuba
Central American and Caribbean Games silver medalists for Cuba
Central American and Caribbean Games medalists in volleyball
Competitors at the 2006 Central American and Caribbean Games
Medalists at the 2007 Pan American Games
Sportspeople from Guantánamo
Middle blockers